Dasysyrphus pauxillus is a North American and European species of hoverfly.

References

Diptera of Europe
Diptera of North America
Syrphini
Insects described in 1887